There are at least 287 species of non-marine molluscs living out of doors in Ukraine: 207 species of terrestrial molluscs, more than 50 freshwater species of gastropods and 30 species of freshwater bivalves

Terrestrial molluscs 
The list is given on the basis of "An annotated checklist of the terrestrial molluscs of Ukraine" published in Journal of Conchology in 2012. In this article 203 species are listed as registered in Ukraine. 

Species that listed by the other sources are given with individual references.

List of the registered in Ukraine terrestrial molluscs 

Aciculidae
 Acicula parcelineata (Clessin, 1911)
 Platyla polita (Hartmann, 1840) – incl. Platyla oedogyra (Paladilhe, 1868)
 Platyla perpusilla (Reinhardt, 1880)
 Platyla jankowskiana (Jackiewicz, 1979)

Pomatiidae
 Pomatias rivularis (Eichwald, 1829)

Ellobiidae
 Ovatella myosotis (Draparnaud, 1801) – amphibiotic species, lives in supralittoral zone, sometimes listed among the terrestrial molluscs, sometimes among the marine molluscs.

Carychiidae
 Carychium minimum O. F. Müller, 1774 
 Carychium tridentatum (Risso, 1826)

Orculidae
 Sphyradium doliolum (Bruguière, 1792)
 Lauria cylindracea (Da Costa, 1778)
 Argna bielzi  (Rossmässler, 1859)

Valloniidae
 Spermodea lamellata Jeffreys, 1830
 Acanthinula aculeata (O. F. Müller, 1774)
 Vallonia costata (O. F. Müller, 1774)
 Vallonia pulchella (O. F. Müller, 1774)
 Vallonia excentrica Sterki, 1893
 Vallonia enniensis (Gredler, 1856)

Cochlicopidae
 Cochlicopa lubrica (O. F. Müller, 1774) – incl. Cochlicopa repentina Hudec, 1960
 Cochlicopa lubricella (Rossmässler, 1835)
 Cochlicopa nitens (Gallenstein, 1848)

Pupillidae
 Gibbulinopsis interrupta (Reinhardt, 1876)
 Pupilla muscorum (Linnaeus, 1758)
 Pupilla triplicata (Studer, 1820)
 Pupilla bigranata (Rossmässler, 1839)
 Pupilla sterrii (Voith, 1840)

Pyramidulidae
 Pyramidula pusilla (Vallot, 1801)

Chondrinidae
 Granaria frumentum (Draparnaud, 1801)
 Chondrina arcadica (Westerlund, 1883)
 Rupestrella rhodia (Roth, 1839)

Vertiginidae
 Vertigo pusilla O. F. Müller, 1774
 Vertigo antivertigo (Draparnaud, 1801)
 Vertigo substriata (Jeffreys, 1833)
 Vertigo pygmaea (Draparnaud, 1801)
 Vertigo moulinsiana (Dupuy, 1849)
 Vertigo geyeri Lindholm, 1925
 Vertigo alpestris Alder, 1837
 Vertigo angustior Jeffreys, 1830
 Columella edentula (Draparnaud, 1805)
 Columella cf. columella (Martens, 1830)
 Truncatellina costulata (Nilsson, 1822)
 Truncatellina claustralis (Gredler, 1856)
 Truncatellina cylindrica (Férussac, 1807)

Enidae
 Merdigera obscura (O. F. Müller, 1774)
 Peristoma merduenianum Krynicki, 1833
 Peristoma rupestre (Krynicki, 1833)	
 Ena montana (Draparnaud, 1801)
 Brephulopsis cylindrica (Menke, 1828)
 Brephulopsis bidens (Krynicki, 1833)
 Brephulopsis konovalovae Gural-Sverlova & Gural, 2010
 Thoanteus gibber (Krynicki, 1833)
 Thoanteus ferrarii Hausdorf, 1994
 Ramusculus subulatus (Rossmässler, 1837)
 Chondrula tridens (O. F. Müller, 1774)
 Chondrula microtragus (Rossmässler, 1839)
 Mastus bielzi (Kimakowicz, 1890)

Clausiliidae
 Serrulina serrulata (L. Pfeiffer 1847)
 Cochlodina laminata (Montagu, 1803)
 Cochlodina orthostoma (Menke, 1828)
 Cochlodina cerata (Rossmässler 1836)
 Elia novorossica (Retowski, 1888)
 Ruthenica filograna (Rossmässler, 1836)
 Macrogastra ventricosa (Draparnaud, 1801)
 Macrogastra tumida (Rossmässler, 1836)
 Macrogastra borealis (O. Boettger, 1878)
 Macrogastra plicatula (Draparnaud, 1801)
 Clausilia cruciata (Studer, 1820)
 Clausilia pumila C. Pfeiffer, 1828
 Clausilia dubia Draparnaud, 1805
 Mentissa canalifera (Rossmässler, 1836)
 Mentissa gracilicosta (Rossmässler, 1836)
 Mentissa velutina Baidashnikov, 1990
 Vestia elata (Rossmässler, 1836)
 Vestia gulo (Bielz, 1859)
 Vestia turgida (Rossmässler, 1836)
 Bulgarica cana (Held, 1836)
 Laciniaria plicata (Draparnaud, 1801)
 Alinda biplicata (Montagu, 1803)
 Alinda fallax (Rossmässler, 1836)
 Alinda stabilis (L. Pfeiffer, 1847)
 Balea perversa (Linnaeus, 1758)

Ferussaciidae
 Cecilioides acicula (O. F. Müller, 1774)
 Cecilioides raddei (O. Boettger, 1879)

Helicodiscidae
 Lucilla singleyana (Pilsbry, 1889)

Punctidae
 Punctum pygmaeum (Draparnaud, 1801)

Discidae
 Discus ruderatus (W. Hartmann, 1821)
 Discus rotundatus (O. F. Müller, 1774)
 Discus perspectivus (Megerle von Mühlfeld, 1816)

Milacidae
 Tandonia cristata (Kaleniczenko, 1851)
 Tandonia retowskii (O. Boettger, 1882) 	
 Tandonia kusceri (H. Wagner, 1931)

Euconulidae
  Euconulus fulvus (O. F. Müller, 1774) – incl. Euconulus alderi (Gray, 1840)

Gastrodontidae
 Zonitoides nitidus (O. F. Müller, 1774)

Zonitidae sensu Riedel, 2000 and Schileyko, 2003 non Hausdorf, 1998
 Vitrea diaphana (Studer, 1820)
 Vitrea transsylvanica (Clessin, 1877)
 Vitrea subrimata (Reinhardt, 1871)
 Vitrea crystallina (O. F. Müller, 1774)
 Vitrea contracta (Westerlund, 1871)
 Vitrea pygmaea (O. Boettger, 1880)
 Vitrea nadejdae Lindholm, 1926
 Taurinellushka babugana Balashov, 2014
 Aegopinella pura (Alder, 1830)
 Aegopinella minor (Stabile, 1864)
 Aegopinella nitens (Michaud, 1831)
 Aegopinella nitidula (Draparnaud, 1805)
 Aegopinella epipedostoma  (Fagot 1879)
 Perpolita hammonis (Strøm, 1765)
 Perpolita petronella (L. Pfeiffer, 1853)
 Cellariopsis deubeli (A. Wagner, 1914)
 Riedeliconcha depressa (Sterki, 1880)
 Morlina glabra (Westerlund, 1881)
 Oxychilus draparnaudi (Beck, 1837)
 Oxychilus diaphanellus (Krynicki, 1836)
 Oxychilus translucidus (Mortillet, 1853)
 Oxychilus deilus (Bourguignat, 1857)
 Oxychilus koutaisanus (Mousson, 1863) – was revealed in 2012 from materials collected in 1995 on the urban area of Svitlodarsk city.
 Oxychilus kobelti (Lindholm, 1910)
 Oxychilus hydatinus (Rossmässler, 1838)
 Oxychilus inopinatus (Uličný, 1887)
 Oxychilus iphigenia (Lindholm, 1926)

Daudebardiidae
 Daudebardia rufa (Draparnaud, 1805)
 Daudebardia brevipes (Draparnaud, 1805)
 Bilania boettgeri (Clessin, 1883)
 Carpathica calophana (Westerlund, 1881)

Trigonochlamydidae
 Selenochlamys cf. ysbryda Rowson & Symondson, 2008 – in 2012 was rediscovered in the Crimean Mountains. Probably a native species.

Parmacellidae
 Parmacella ibera (Eichwald, 1841)

Vitrinidae
 Phenacolimax annularis (Studer, 1820)
 Semilimax semilimax (Férussac, 1802)
 Semilimax kotulae (Westerlund, 1883)
 Eucobresia nivalis (Dumont & Mortillet, 1854)
 Vitrina pellucida (O. F. Müller, 1774)

Limacidae
 Malacolimax tenellus (O. F. Müller, 1774)
 Lehmannia marginata (O. F. Müller, 1774)
 Lehmannia macroflagellata Grossu & Lupu, 1962
 Limax maximus Linnaeus, 1758
 Limax cinereoniger Wolf, 1803
 Limax bielzii Seibert, 1874
 Limacus flavus (Linnaeus, 1758)
 Limacus maculatus (Kaleniczenko, 1851)
 Bielzia coerulans (Bielz, 1851)

Agriolimacidae
 Deroceras laeve (O. F. Müller, 1774)
 Deroceras sturanyi (Simroth, 1894)
 Deroceras agreste (Linnaeus, 1758)
 Deroceras reticulatum (O. F. Müller, 1774)
 Deroceras turcicum (Simroth, 1894)
 Deroceras tauricum (Simroth, 1901) incl. Deroceras crimense (Simroth, 1901)
 Deroceras rodnae Grossu & Lupu, 1965
 Deroceras subagreste (Simroth, 1892)
 Deroceras bakurianum (Simroth, 1912)
 Deroceras caucasicum (Simroth, 1901)
 Deroceras moldavicum (Grossu & Lupu, 1961)
 Deroceras occidentale (Grossu & Lupu, 1966)
 Krynickillus melanocephalus Kaleniczenko, 1851

Boettgerillidae
 Boettgerilla pallens Simroth, 1912

Bradybaenidae
 Fruticicola fruticum (O. F. Müller, 1774)

Helicidae
 Drobacia banatica (Rossmässler, 1838)
 Isognomostoma isognomostomos (Schröter, 1784)
 Arianta arbustorum (Linnaeus, 1758)
 Arianta petrii (Kimakowicz, 1890)
 Campylaea faustina (Rossmässler, 1835)
 Eobania vermiculata (O.F. Müller, 1774)
 Helix pomatia Linnaeus, 1758
 Helix lutescens (Rossmässler, 1837)
 Helix albescens (Rossmässler, 1839)
 Helix lucorum Linnaeus, 1758
 Cepaea hortensis (O. F. Müller, 1774)
 Cepaea nemoralis (Linnaeus, 1758)
 Cepaea vindobonensis (C. Pfeiffer, 1828)

Hygromiidae
 Plicuteria lubomirskii (Ślósarskii, 1881)
 Trochulus hispidus (Linnaeus, 1758) incl. Trochulus concinnus (Jeffreys 1830)
 Trochulus villosulus (Rossmässler, 1838)
 Trochulus bielzi (Bielz, 1859)
 Edentiella bakowskii (Polinski, 1924)
 Helicopsis striata (O. F. Müller, 1774)
 Helicopsis retowskii (Clessin, 1883)
 Helicopsis dejecta (Cristofori & Jan, 1832)
 Helicopsis gasprensis (Hesse, 1934)
 Helicopsis instabilis (Rossmässler, 1838)
 Helicopsis filimargo (Krynicki, 1833)
 Helicopsis subfilimargo Gural-Sverlova, 2010
 Helicopsis martynovi Gural-Sverlova, 2010
 Helicopsis luganica Gural-Sverlova, 2010
 Xeropicta krynickii (Krynicki, 1833)
 Xeropicta derbentina (Krynicki, 1836)
 Xerolenta obvia (Menke, 1828)
 Pseudotrichia rubiginosa (Rossmässler, 1838) incl. Trochulus czarnohoricus  (Poliński, 1924)
 Monachoides vicinus (Rossmässler, 1842)
 Monachoides incarnatus (O. F. Müller, 1774)
 Perforatella bidentata (Gmelin, 1791)
 Perforatella dibothrion (Kimakowicz, 1884)
 Prostenomphalia carpathica (Baidashnikov, 1985)
 Urticicola umbrosus (C. Pfeiffer, 1828)
 Cernuella virgata (Da Costa, 1778)
 Harmozica ravergiensis (Férussac, 1835)
 Euomphalia strigella (Draparnaud, 1801)
 Monacha cartusiana (O. F. Müller, 1774)
 Monacha claustralis (Menke, 1828)
 Monacha fruticola (Krynicki, 1833)

Arionidae
 Arion circumscriptus Johnston, 1828
 Arion fasciatus (Nilsson, 1823)
 Arion silvaticus Lohmander, 1937
 Arion subfuscus sensu lato – Arion fuscus (O. F. Müller, 1774) and Arion transsylvanus Simroth 1885 are expected
 Arion distinctus Mabille, 1868
 Arion lusitanicus sensu lato

Succineidae
 Succinea putris (Linnaeus, 1758)
 Succinella oblonga (Draparnaud, 1801)
 Oxyloma elegans (Risso, 1826)
 Oxyloma sarsii (Esmark, 1886)

Terrestrial molluscs whose presence in Ukraine is doubtful

Moreover in "An annotated checklist of the terrestrial molluscs of Ukraine" list of species which were reported for Ukraine erroneously or doubtfully is given. It includes: Pilorcula trifilaris (Mousson, 1856), Chondrina avenacea (Bruguière, 1792), Abida secale (Draparnaud, 1801), Zebrina detrita (O.F. Müller, 1774), Zebrina dardana (Philippi, 1844), Chondrus zebrula (Férussac, 1821), Chondrus tournefortianus (Férussac, 1821), Mastus pupa (Linnaeus, 1758), Mastus caucasicus (L. Pfeiffer, 1852), Cochlodina costata (C. Pfeiffer 1828), Scrobifera taurica (L. Pfeiffer 1848), Poiretia sp., Oxychilus subeffusus (O. Boettger 1879), Oxychilus cellarius (O. F. Müller, 1774), Oxychilus alliarius (Miller, 1822), Aegopis verticillus (Lamarck, 1822), Helicigona cingulata (Studer, 1820), Causa holosericea (S. Studer, 1820), Cornu aspersum (O. F. Müller, 1774), Arion hortensis Férussac, 1819, Arion ater sensu lato, Oxyloma dunkeri (L. Pfeiffer, 1865), Orcula dolium (Draparnaud, 1801), Pagodulina pagodula (Des Moulins, 1830), Bulgarica vetusta (Rossmässler, 1836), Alopia glauca (Bielz, 1853) and Deroceras praecox Wiktor, 1966.

Freshwater molluscs

List of freshwater Gastropoda

List of freshwater Bivalvia
List is given on the basis of 2002 annotated checklist.

Unionidae
 Unio tumidus tumidus Philipsson, 1788
 Unio pictorum (Linnaeus, 1758)
 Unio crassus (Philipsson, 1788)
 Anodonta cygnea (Linnaeus, 1758)
 Anodonta anatina (Linnaeus, 1758)
 Sinanodonta woodiana (Lea, 1834) – invasive species
 Pseudanodonta complanata (Rossmässler, 1835)

Sphaeriidae
 Sphaerium rivicola (Lamarck, 1818)
 Sphaerium solidum (Normand, 1844)
 Sphaerium corneum (Linnaeus, 1758)
 Sphaerium nucleus (Studer, 1820)
 Sphaerium ovale (A. Férussac, 1807)
 Musculium lacustre (O. F. Müller, 1774)
 Pisidium amnicum (O. F. Müller, 1774)
 Pisidium moitessierianum Paladilhe, 1866
 Pisidium personatum Malm, 1855
 Pisidium casertanum (Poli, 1791)
 Pisidium globulare Westerlund & Clessin, 1873
 Pisidium obtusale (Lamarck, 1818)
 Pisidium henslowanum (Sheppard, 1823)
 Pisidium supinum A. Schmidt, 1851
 Pisidium lilljeborgii Clessin, 1886
 Pisidium nitidum Jenyns, 1832
 Pisidium pseudosphaerium J. Favre, 1927
 Pisidium hibernicum Westerlund, 1894
 Pisidium subtruncatum Malm, 1855
 Pisidium pulchellum Jenyns, 1832
 Pisidium milium Held, 1836

Dreissenidae
 Dreissena polymorpha (Pallas, 1771)
 Dreissena bugensis Andrusov, 1897

See also
Lists of molluscs of surrounding countries:
 List of non-marine molluscs of Poland
 List of non-marine molluscs of Slovakia
 List of non-marine molluscs of the Czech Republic

References

Ukraine
Lists of biota of Ukraine
Ukraine
Ukraine